The Château de Chenonceau is a French château spanning the river Cher, near the small village of Chenonceaux, Indre-et-Loire, Centre-Val de Loire. It is one of the best-known châteaux of the Loire Valley.

The estate of Chenonceau is first mentioned in writing in the 11th century. The current château was built in 1514–1522 on the foundations of an old mill and was later extended to span the river. The bridge over the river was built (1556–1559) to designs by the French Renaissance architect Philibert de l'Orme, and the gallery on the bridge, built from 1570 to 1576 to designs by Jean Bullant.

Description

An architectural mixture of late Gothic and early Renaissance, Château de Chenonceau and its gardens are open to the public.  Other than the Royal Palace of Versailles, it is the most visited château in France.

The château has been designated as a Monument historique since 1840 by the French Ministry of Culture. Today, Chenonceau is a major tourist attraction and in 2007 received around 800,000 visitors.

History

The Marques family
In the 13th century, the fief of Chenonceau belonged to the Marques family. The original château was torched in 1412 to punish the owner, Jean Marques, for an act of sedition. He rebuilt a château and fortified mill on the site in the 1430s. Jean Marques' indebted heir Pierre Marques found it necessary to sell.

Thomas Bohier
, Chamberlain to King Charles VIII of France, purchased the castle from Pierre Marques in 1513 and demolished most of it (resulting in 2013 being considered the 500th anniversary of the castle: MDXIII–MMXIII), though its 15th-century keep was left standing. Bohier built an entirely new residence between 1515 and 1521. The work was overseen by his wife Katherine Briçonnet, who delighted in hosting French nobility, including King Francis I on two occasions.

Diane de Poitiers

After Francis' death in 1547, Henry II offered the château as a gift to his mistress, Diane de Poitiers, who became fervently attached to the château along the river. In 1555 she commissioned Philibert de l'Orme to build the arched bridge joining the château to its opposite bank. Diane then oversaw the planting of extensive flower and vegetable gardens along with a variety of fruit trees. Set along the banks of the river, but buttressed from flooding by stone terraces, the exquisite gardens were laid out in four triangles.

Diane de Poitiers was the unquestioned mistress of the castle, but ownership remained with the crown until 1555 when years of delicate legal manoeuvres finally yielded possession to her.

Catherine de' Medici
After King Henry II died in 1559, his strong-willed widow and regent Catherine de' Medici forced Diane to exchange it for the Château Chaumont.  Queen Catherine then made Chenonceau her own favourite residence, adding a new series of gardens.

As Regent of France, Catherine spent a fortune on the château and on spectacular nighttime parties.  In 1560, the first-ever fireworks display seen in France took place during the celebrations marking the ascension to the throne of Catherine's son Francis II.  The grand gallery, which extended along the existing bridge to cross the entire river, was dedicated in 1577. Catherine also added rooms between the chapel and the library on the east side of the corps de logis, as well as a service wing on the west side of the entry courtyard.

Catherine considered an even greater expansion of the château, shown in an engraving published by Jacques Androuet du Cerceau in the second (1579) volume of his book Les plus excellents bastiments de France. If this project had been executed, the current château would have been only a small portion of an enormous manor laid out "like pincers around the existing buildings."

Louise de Lorraine

On Catherine's death, in January 1589, the château went to her daughter-in-law, Louise of Lorraine, wife of King Henry III.  Louise was at Chenonceau when she learned of her husband's assassination, in August 1589, and she fell into a state of depression. Louise spent the next 11 years, until her death in January 1601, wandering aimlessly along the château's corridors dressed in mourning clothes, amidst sombre black tapestries stitched with skulls and crossbones.

Duc de Vendôme
Henri IV obtained Chenonceau for his mistress Gabrielle d'Estrées by paying the debts of Catherine de' Medici, which had been inherited by Louise and were threatening to ruin her. In return, Louise left the château to her niece Françoise de Lorraine, at that time six years old and betrothed to the four-year-old César de Bourbon, duc de Vendôme, the natural son of Gabrielle d'Estrées and Henri IV. The château belonged to the Duc de Vendôme and his descendants for more than a hundred years. The Bourbons had little interest in the château, except for hunting. In 1650, Louis XIV was the last king of the ancien régime to visit.

The Château de Chenonceau was bought by the Duke of Bourbon in 1720.  Little by little, he sold off all of the castle's contents.  Many of the fine statues ended up at Versailles.

Louise Dupin

In 1733 the estate was sold for 130,000 livres to a wealthy squire named . His wife, Louise Dupin, was the natural daughter of the financier Samuel Bernard and the actress , whose mother was also an actress who had joined the Comédie Française in 1684. Louise Dupin was "an intelligent, beautiful, and highly cultivated woman who had the theatre in her blood." Claude Dupin, a widower, had a son, Louis Claude, from his first wife Marie-Aurore de Saxe, who was the grandmother of George Sand (born Aurore Dupin).

Louise Dupin's literary salon at Chenonceau attracted such  leaders of the Enlightenment as the writers Voltaire, Montesquieu, and  Fontenelle, the naturalist Buffon, the playwright Marivaux, the philosopher Condillac, as well as the Marquise de Tencin and the Marquise du Deffand. Jean-Jacques Rousseau was Dupin's secretary and tutored her son. Rousseau, who worked on Émile at Chenonceau, wrote in his Confessions: "We played music there and staged comedies. I wrote a play in verse entitled Sylvie's Path, after the name of a path in the park along the Cher."

The widowed Louise Dupin saved the château from destruction during the French Revolution, preserving it from being destroyed by the Revolutionary Guard because "it was essential to travel and commerce, being the only bridge across the river for many miles."

Marguerite Pelouze

In 1864 , a rich heiress, acquired the château. Around 1875 she commissioned the architect Félix Roguet to restore it. He almost completely renewed the interior and removed several of Catherine de' Medici's additions, including the rooms between the library and the chapel and her alterations to the north facade, among which were figures of Hercules, Pallas, Apollo, and Cybele that were moved to the park. With the money Marguerite spent on these projects and elaborate parties, her finances were depleted, and the château was seized and sold.

Recent history
José-Emilio Terry, a Cuban millionaire, acquired Chenonceau from Madame Pelouze in 1891. Terry sold it in 1896 to a family member, Francisco Terry. In 1913, the château was acquired by Henri Menier, a member of the Menier family, famous for their chocolates, who still own it to this day.

During World War I Gaston Menier set up the gallery to be used as a hospital ward. During the Second World War, the château was bombed by the Germans in June 1940. It was also a means of escaping from the Nazi-occupied zone on one side of the river Cher to the "free" zone on the opposite bank. Occupied by the Germans, the château was bombed by the Allies on 7 June 1944, when the chapel was hit and its windows destroyed.

In 1951, the Menier family entrusted the château's restoration to Bernard Voisin, who brought the dilapidated structure and the gardens (ravaged in the Cher flood in 1940) back to a reflection of its former glory.

Gallery

See also 
List of castles in France
Château de Montsoreau, built in the Loire riverbed

Notes

Bibliography

 
 Beck, Shari (2011). A Portrait in Black and White: Diane de Poitiers in Her Own Words. Bloomington, Indiana: iUniverse. .

External links 

 Chenonceau (official website)
 Visit of Château de Chenonceau in 3D

Houses completed in 1521
Chenonceau
Castles in Centre-Val de Loire
Renaissance architecture in France
Châteaux with Renaissance gardens in France
Chenonceau
Chenonceau
Menier family
Historic house museums in Centre-Val de Loire
Museums in Indre-et-Loire
1521 establishments in France
Châteaux in France
Bridges with buildings
Chenonceau